The Tour du Nord was a multi-day road cycling race held in Nord-Pas-de-Calais, France between 1933 and 1973.

Winners

References

Cycle races in France
1909 establishments in France
Recurring sporting events established in 1909
1973 disestablishments in France
Recurring sporting events disestablished in 1973
Defunct cycling races in France